Soka University of America (SUA) is a private liberal arts college in Aliso Viejo, California. Originally founded in 1987, it was established on its current campus in 2001 by Daisaku Ikeda, the founder of the Soka Gakkai International Buddhist movement. Though affiliated with Soka Gakkai, it maintains a secular curriculum which emphasizes pacifism, human rights, and the creative coexistence of nature and humanity.

A much larger and older sister school, Sōka University in Japan, is located in Hachiōji, Tokyo. SUA encompasses both a four-year liberal arts college and a graduate school offering a Master's program in Educational Leadership and Societal Change. SUA also hosts the Pacific Basin Research Center and the newly created SUA Center for Race, Ethnicity, and Human Rights.

It has an endowment of $1.2 billion , giving it the second-highest endowment per student of any college or university in the United States.

History and philosophy

SUA is a secular and nonsectarian college founded by Daisaku Ikeda, the President of Soka Gakkai International (SGI). SUA's philosophical foundation originated in the work of Tsunesaburō Makiguchi, who was the first President of Soka Gakkai (previous name Soka Kyoiku Gakkai) and created a society for educators dedicated to social and educational reform in Japan during the years leading up to World War II. Makiguchi was an elementary school principal, strongly influenced by John Dewey and American educational progressivism.

Between 1930-1934, Makiguchi published his four-volume work, Sōka Kyōikugaku Taikei (Value Creating Education System), to argue for his belief that education should proceed through dialogue instead of "force-feeding" information to students. This student-centered and humanistic philosophy, he argued, made "the purpose of education" an effort "to lead students to happiness." Education, he asserted, should be directed toward "creating value" for the individual and society. Makiguchi was a pacifist and an ardent believer in religious liberty and freedom of conscience. Jailed by Japanese authorities during World War II for ideas and actions inimical to the war effort, he died in prison on 18 November 1944. After the war, as the Soka Gakkai organization grew, Makiguchi's educational philosophy became the centerpiece of a number of Soka schools in Japan advocated by his successors, Jōsei Toda (second President of Soka Gakkai, a former elementary school teacher) and Daisaku Ikeda (third President of Soka Gakkai), who is the founder of SUA. Ikeda describes the founding of SUA as the fruition of the dreams of Makiguchi and Toda.

Allegations of sectarianism 
In 2003, two professors claimed they experienced religious discrimination, breach of contract as well as age discrimination. One professor took legal action against SUA based on these allegations, but her case was dismissed on summary judgment. Soka University administrators disputed all allegations of discrimination and noted that the majority of faculty and staff are not Buddhist, said there was no evidence of preferential treatment, and said that the institution has never taught nor will it teach Buddhist—or any other—religious practices.

In 2011, Michelle Woo wrote an article for OC Weekly, a local publication in Orange County, California, in which she mentioned possible proselytizing of non-Buddhist staff and students. The article was disputed by Soka University students, faculty, and staff.

Campus

Calabasas
In 1987, SUA was formed as a not-for-profit organization incorporated in the state of California. Initially it was a small graduate school located on the  former Gillette−Brown Ranch in Calabasas and the Santa Monica Mountains. Originally the location was the site of pre-Columbian Talepop, a settlement of the Chumash people. It was within the Spanish land grant Rancho Las Virgenes in the 19th century. In the 1920s, it became the rural estate of King Gillette with a mansion designed by Wallace Neff. In 1952, it became the Claretville seminary of the Claretian Order of the Catholic Church, and in 1977 it became the religious center of Elizabeth Clare Prophet and the Church Universal and Triumphant (CUT). In 1986, CUT sold the  property to Soka University of Japan.

Soka University of America (SUA), originally called Soka University of Los Angeles (SULA), initially operated a small ESL (English as a Second Language) school at the Calabasas campus, enrolling just under 100 students. In 1990, SUA announced plans to build a future liberal arts college on campus and plans to expand the facility over the next 25 years to an enrollment of as many as 5,000 students. SUA began making plans to expand the campus infrastructure to accommodate living quarters and classrooms for the proposed expansion, but ran into opposition from some local residents, the Santa Monica Mountains Conservancy, environmentalists, and government representatives. Opponents sought to protect the Chumash ancestral site, the natural habitats and ecology, and the expansive open space viewshed within the Santa Monica Mountains National Recreation Area, and to prevent a development of unprecedented urban density adjacent to Malibu Creek State Park.

In 1992, the Mountains Recreation and Conservation Authority (MRCA), a joint-powers authority associated with the Santa Monica Mountains Conservancy, resorted to its powers of eminent domain to condemn the core parcel comprising the institution and thereby halted SUA's plans for expansion. SUA appealed the eminent domain action. In 1994, SUA opened a small graduate school, offering an MA in Second and Foreign Language Education with a concentration in Teaching English to Speakers of Other Languages (TESOL). The legal debate continued for the remainder of the decade. Soka University was prevented from developing any expansion plans at the Calabasas property and began looking for alternative sites to build a larger campus.

The Graduate School held its first commencement in December 1995, and in the same year SUA acquired a 103-acre site in Aliso Viejo for a private non-profit four-year liberal arts college. The Aliso Viejo campus opened on May 3, 2001 with a freshman class of 120 students from 18 countries and 18 states. In June 2005, Soka University received its accreditation from the Accrediting Commission for Senior Colleges and Universities of the Western Association of Schools and Colleges (WASC).

SUA sold the Calabasas property in April 2005 to a coalition of buyers led by the Mountains Recreation and Conservation Authority (MRCA). The former campus is now public parkland, known as King Gillette Ranch Park, and houses the visitor center for the Santa Monica Mountains National Recreation Area. In 2007, the Calabasas campus was closed and the Graduate School relocated to the Aliso Viejo campus.

Aliso Viejo

In 1995, the institution bought  of rough-graded property for $25 million in Aliso Viejo, located in southern Orange County, California. It then spent $225 million to build the first 18 buildings of the new campus, which opened to 120 first year undergraduate students on 24 August 2001. The architecture was designed in a style resembling an Italian hillside village in Tuscany, with red-tiled roofs, stonework, and earth colors. Three academic buildings were named after the founder and Sōka Gakkai's third president Daisaku Ikeda and his wife, Kaneko Ikeda; 20th−century peace activists Linus Pauling and Eva Helen Pauling; and Mohandas Gandhi and Kasturba Gandhi. An additional academic building dedicated in 2012 was named after Nobel Peace Laureate Wangari Maathai.

Since August 2007 the Aliso Viejo campus has been the home for all of SUA's graduate, undergraduate, and research programs. The Aliso Viejo campus is bordered on three sides by Aliso and Wood Canyons Wilderness Park encompassing a  county wildlife sanctuary.

In 2017, Soka University of America began construction on two new residential halls and a new science building. Each new residence hall houses 50 people, allowing the campus to expand its student population by 100. The science hall is the home of the new Life Sciences Concentration, which allows undergraduates to complete pre-med requirements and study topics related to biology, medicine, and health. Both projects were completed by Fall 2020.

Ultimately, Soka University of America plans to build additional residence halls, academic buildings and expanded dining facilities to accommodate up to a maximum of ~1,000 students in total.

Academics

SUA has an 8:1 student/faculty ratio and an average class size of 12.

 The undergraduate college offers a Bachelor of Liberal Arts with emphasis areas in Environmental Studies, Humanities, Social & Behavioral Sciences, International Studies, or Life Sciences. Classrooms typically use seminar methods.
 The graduate school offers a Master of Arts degree in Educational Leadership and Societal Change. 
 The Pacific Basin Research Center supports research on the humane and peaceful development of the Asia-Pacific Region, including the Latin American border states. It awards grants and fellowships to researchers studying public policy interactions in the Pacific Rim in such areas as international security, economic and social development, educational and cultural reform, environmental protection and human rights. The Center also sponsors campus conferences, occasional lecture series, and student seminars that extend and support its research activities.
The Center for Race, Ethnicity, and Human Rights will host individuals from around the country and the globe who work to increase understanding and progress on addressing the issues confronting society, including global and local ethnic conflict as well as systemic and institutional racism in the United States.

Rankings 

Soka University of America's ranking in the U.S. News & World Reports 2020 edition of Best Colleges is tied for 27th overall, 7th in "Best Value", and 9th in "Top Performers on Social Mobility" among U.S. liberal arts colleges.

For 2020, Washington Monthly ranked Soka 87th among liberal arts colleges in the U.S. based on their contribution to the public good, as measured by social mobility, research, and promoting public service.

In 2015, the Christian Science Monitor listed SUA 2nd on a top 10 list of the most globally minded colleges.

Curriculum 
There are no discipline-based departments at Soka University. Instead, the institution has focused on interdisciplinarity.  SUA undergraduates get a bachelor's degree in Liberal Arts, while choosing one of five possible concentration tracks:
Environmental Studies
Humanities
International Studies
Life Sciences
Social & Behavioral Sciences

Learning clusters
Learning clusters are three-week intensive courses focused on a significant problem of contemporary relevance. Faculty and students develop learning clusters in collaboration during each fall semester. The primary goal is to produce an "educated response" and build student skills for research, critical thought, and active engagement in the world. Learning clusters typically create a collaborative final project designed to be shared with the "off campus" world in some way. Each year several learning clusters travel within and outside the United States (South America, Central America, China, India, and Korea as well as other places) with funding from the Luis & Linda Nieves Family Foundation.

Study abroad
All undergraduate students at Soka University of America must study a non-native language. The languages offered are Spanish, French, Mandarin Chinese, and Japanese. The language must be studied for two years, then all undergraduate students at Soka University of America study abroad for one semester in the spring or fall of their junior year in a country whose language they are studying (costs included in tuition). SUA was the first liberal arts college in the US to require mandatory study abroad for all students when it opened in 2001. The first students went abroad in 2004.

Student life

About 60% of SUA's student body is from the United States, with the other 40% coming from 30 other countries on six continents. From 2014 until the present, Soka University has been ranked #1 in "Foreign Student Factor" (highest percentage of international students) among national liberal arts colleges by U.S. News & World Report.  

SUA is a residential college and students live on campus in one of eight residential buildings. Parking is free on campus and a free half-hourly shuttle service is offered to enrolled students.

Athletics
The Soka athletic teams are called the Lions. The institution is a member of the National Association of Intercollegiate Athletics (NAIA), primarily competing in the California Pacific Conference (Cal Pac) for most of its sports since the 2012–13 academic year; its men's & women's swimming & diving teams compete in the Pacific Collegiate Swim and Dive Conference (PCSC). The Lions previously competed as an NAIA Independent within the Association of Independent Institutions (AII) from 2008–09 to 2011–12.

Soka competes in nine intercollegiate varsity sports: Men's sports include cross country, soccer, swimming & diving and track & field; while women's sports include cross country, golf, soccer, swimming & diving and track & field.

Admissions and graduation rate

For the Class of 2025 (enrolling fall 2021), Soka received 939 applications, accepted 180 (19.2%) and enrolled 111. The middle 50% range of SAT scores was 570–670 for reading and 610–740 for math, while the middle 50% range for the ACT composite score was 25–30 for enrolled first year students.

Since 2008, full tuition Soka Opportunity Scholarships are available for admitted students whose families make $60,000 or less. SUA was named #4 in U.S. News & World Report's 2015 national rankings for "Best Value - Liberal Arts Colleges".

Between 2005-2007 SUA graduated its first three undergraduate classes with an average graduation rate of 90%. As of 2007, 38% of SUA graduates had gone on to graduate programs.

Notable people 
A notable alumna of Soka University of America is Tahereh Mafi, New York Times best selling author. Notable faculty includes humanities professors Robert Allinson and Jim Merod, the latter having recorded numerous jazz artists (including Herbie Hancock and Ella Fitzgerald) in addition to his scholarship.

References

Bibliography

External links 

 
 Official athletics website

 
Universities and colleges in Orange County, California
Aliso Viejo, California
Soka Gakkai
Buddhist universities and colleges in the United States
Liberal arts colleges in California
Schools accredited by the Western Association of Schools and Colleges
Alternative education
Nichiren Buddhism
Progressive colleges
Educational institutions established in 1987
1987 establishments in California
Educational institutions established in 2001
2001 establishments in California
Private universities and colleges in California